is a metro station on the Osaka Metro Tanimachi Line located in Hirano-ku, Osaka, Japan.

Layout
This station has an island platform serving two tracks under Nagai-koen-dori Street, and a returning track in the east of the platform.

External links

 Official Site 
 Official Site 

Hirano-ku, Osaka
Osaka Metro stations
Railway stations in Japan opened in 1980